The New Economic Party (HaMiflagah HaKalkalit HaHadasha) is a socio-economic political party in Israel founded by the economist and former Israeli Ministry of Finance accountant general, Yaron Zelekha, in December 2020.

History 
In December 2020, Zelekha announced that he formed a new political party, which would be called the New Economic Party, based on an economic vision and will run as a candidate in the March 2021 national election in Israel. 

In January of 2021, ahead of the deadline to submit the party's electoral list, Zelekha announced his party's slate for the upcoming election, which included several professors, who were designated as the party's nominees for various cabinet positions.

Policy

Economy 
Zelekha argues that Israel suffers from a significant amount of corruption. In addition, he supports a reduction of the Value-added tax to 15%.

Education 
The party's plan to reform the education system centers on reducing the number of students in the classrooms by reducing teaching hours.

Leaders

Knesset election results

References

Politics of Israel
Political parties in Israel
Political parties established in 2020
2020 establishments in Israel